Valea Moldovei (in the past known as Valea Seacă) is a commune located in Suceava County, Bukovina, northeastern Romania. It is composed of two villages, more specifically Mironu and Valea Moldovei. It also included Capu Câmpului village from 1968 to 2003, when it was split off to form a separate commune.

References 

Communes in Suceava County
Localities in Southern Bukovina
Duchy of Bukovina